Emily Hall Tremaine (1908–1987) was a prominent art director and collector. She published Apéritif, a society magazine.

Early life 
Tremaine was born in Butte, Montana, in 1908.

The Tremaine Collection 
Hall Tremaine's interest in art began in the 1920s and '30s while she lived in Santa Barbara, California, as she developed friendships with art collectors and curators who were instrumental in shaping her views on modern art. They included Walter and Louise Arensberg, Mildred Barnes, Robert Woods Bliss, Dr. Grace Louise McCann Morley and Arthur Everett Austin Jr.

The Tremaine collection, which began with her purchase of Mondrian's Broadway Boogie-Woogie in 1944 shortly after it left the artist's studio comprises more than 400 works by European and American artists, ranging from Braque, Picasso and Klee to such contemporary Americans as Michael Heizer, Neil Jenney and Robert Irwin. A major exhibition of some 150 objects appeared in 1984 at the Wadsworth Atheneum in Hartford.

The Tremaines began dispersing their collection in 1980. The 1958 painting Three Flags by Johns was purchased by the Whitney Museum of American Art in 1981 for the record price at the time of $1 million. In November 1988 and November 1991 Christie's New York held auctions of the couple's works, funds of which were used to establish the Emily Hall Tremaine Foundation.

The papers of Tremaine are on display at the Smithsonian Museum, donated in 2005 by Hall Tremaine's step-grandson, Burton G. Tremaine III, and date from circa 1890 to 2004. They document the development of Tremaine's collection of modernist, pop and contemporary art. The papers comprise biographical material, including a sound recording, personal correspondence, art collection files, artist files, exhibition loan files.

Personal life 
In the mid-1940s she moved to New York and met and married Burton Tremaine. Hall Tremaine died on December 17, 1987 at her home in Madison.

References 
Citations

Sources

 
 

1908 births
People from Butte, Montana
People from Madison, Connecticut
People from Meriden, Connecticut
American art directors
1987 deaths
American magazine publishers (people)